Becquer or Bécquer may refer to:

 Gustavo Adolfo Domínguez Bastida, better known as Gustavo Adolfo Bécquer, a Spanish post-romanticist writer of poetry and short stories'
 Valeriano Bécquer, a Spanish painter, brother of the above.
 Salvador Bécquer Puig, a Uruguayan poet and journalist
 Julio Bécquer, a Cuban professional baseball player

See also
 Becker (disambiguation)